Aaradhya Maheshwari, better known as Arradhya Maan, in an Indian actor and producer mostly known for his work in Bollywood films Ujda Chaman and Khuda Haafiz.

Early life 
Maan was born in Kota, Rajasthan, India.

Career

Producer 
Maan from his early age use to create videos on YouTube and film monologues.

Maan made his debut as a co-Producer with comedy-drama movie Ujda Chaman in 2019. Film focused on a rapidly growing social issue "pattern baldness". Following the success, Maan made his OTT debut with an action thriller Khuda Haafiz in 2020 on Disney+ Hotstar as an actor and an associate producer.

Musical career 
Maan was last seen with Avneet kaur in a song 'Tera Hoon Na'. Maan is currently pairing up with Big boss 14 contestant Nikki Tamboli in an upcoming new music single.

Films

References

External links 

Arradhya Maan on Instagram

Living people
1991 births